Robert F. Hall Catholic Secondary School (frequently referred to as Hall or abbreviated as RFH) is a Catholic school located in Caledon, Ontario, Canada. The school was named after Robert Francis (Bobby Soxer) Hall (1925–1989), the first lay person after whom a Catholic secondary school has been named in the Dufferin-Peel Catholic District School Board. The school's patron saint is St. Francis of Assisi.

History
As of 1999, the school shared its library with the Town of Caledon.

The actor David Reale, best known for his roles as Benjamin in Suits, attended the school.

Feeder schools
 St. Andrew Catholic Elementary School
 St. Benedict Catholic Elementary School
 St. Cornelius Catholic Elementary School
 St. Evan Catholic Elementary School 
 St. Peter Catholic Elementary School
 St. Rita Catholic Elementary School (only  those students residing north of Mayfield Road)

Enrollment
As of October 2021, Robert F. Hall Catholic Secondary School has a total enrollment of 1,120 students. It is open to residents in Caledon, Orangeville, Shelburne, and other small towns in the area. The school is also open to students of the extended french program from Bolton

Extracurricular activities
There are multiple student groups, school clubs and sports teams that are currently active at Robert F. Hall. The school implemented the Link Crew program, which gives freshmen a chance to meet with senior students for some peer guidance.

Robert F. Hall has a well formed student council consisting of an average of 10 students per grade and three teacher supervisors. Executive positions include, Secretary, Treasurer, Communications Officer, President, Vice president, and or co-presidents. Student Council meets after school weekly to discuss current issues in the school and organize fun themed, or seasonal events for students. Presidents are chosen through vote every May during their spirit week.

Athletic Council is similar to student council however fund raises through buy-ins where student purchase tickets to view their fellow students play and compete against other schools in sports tournaments. Buy-ins often occur for football games over any other sport. Athletic Council also holds inter mural sports for students that occur after school where students make teams of 10 and compete against other teams in soccer. The badminton tournament is a school favorite where a student teams up with a teacher of the school and compete against another team in order to win.

AV Crew is a group of students that set up and run the technical equipment for all school events such as assemblies, presentations and awards.

Eco Crew is a club that welcomes members anytime of the year and were successful in getting the school recognized regionally for eco efforts in 2013.

Helping out the Community with Hall
Every year link crew and supervisors organize an introduction to give the freshmen students a taste of being a student at Hall. For the past few years Link Crew, supervisors and of course the grade 9s have had their retreat at Teen Ranch where students get to participate in fun activities such as horse back riding. Students end off the night with a bonfire where link leaders and the first years get to tell ghost stories and show case their talents.

See also

List of high schools in Ontario

References

External links
 Robert F. Hall Catholic Secondary School
 School Newspaper - The Howler

Catholic secondary schools in Ontario
High schools in Caledon, Ontario
Educational institutions established in 1992
1992 establishments in Ontario